Shadow on the Land, also known as United States: It Can't Happen Here, is a 1968 television film which aired on ABC. It was adapted from the 1935 Sinclair Lewis novel It Can't Happen Here by Nedrick Young, and directed by Richard C. Sarafian. The plot involves a President creating a fascist, totalitarian regime in the United States, and a resistance movement forming against it.

References

External links
 

1960s dystopian films
1968 television films
1968 films
American television films
Films based on American novels
Films based on science fiction novels
Films based on works by Sinclair Lewis
Films scored by Sol Kaplan
Screen Gems films
Television pilots not picked up as a series
Films directed by Richard C. Sarafian